The snake cube is a mechanical puzzle, a chain of 27 or 64 cubelets, connected by an elastic band running through them, creating a specific sequence of straight and bent connections. The cubelets can rotate freely.  The aim of the puzzle is to arrange the chain in such a way that they will form a 3×3×3 or 4×4×4 cube. While all commercially available 3×3×3 cubes appear to be identical in terms of the sequence of straight and bent connections, and have only one solution (up to symmetry), at least two different 4×4×4 cubes are sold, both having four unique solutions.

Variations 

A variation on the puzzle is a Kibble cube, which is also a string of cubes but has slots on the cubes.  There are also many different styles of the cube.  It can be made up of wood or plastic and can vary in colour, material and size.

References

External links 
 Snake Cube at Mathematische Basteleien
 Snake Cube at www.jaapsch.net

Mechanical puzzle cubes
Educational toys